Sichuan University Sports Centre (Simplified Chinese: 四川大学体育中心) is a multi-use stadium in Sichuan University, Chengdu, Sichuan, China. It is currently used mostly for football matches. The stadium's capacity is 10,000 people.

References

Football venues in Chengdu
Sports venues in Sichuan
Sport in Chengdu
University sports venues in China